Ali Hashemi may refer to:

 Ali Hashemi (commander) (1961–1988), Iranian military commander
 Ali Hashemi (weightlifter) (born 1991), Iranian Olympic weightlifter
 Ali Bani Hashemi (born 1934), Iranian Olympic wrestler